Come Clarity is the eighth studio album by Swedish heavy metal band In Flames, released in February 2006. It was originally going to be called Crawl Through Knives but was later changed to its current title.

The album features the artwork of Derek Hess, who is popular among metal bands and has produced artwork for Converge and Sepultura amongst others. Specifically the artwork of Sepultura's album Roorback has a lot of similarities.

The songs "Take This Life" and "Come Clarity" have music videos. "Take This Life" is also a playable track in the video game Guitar Hero III: Legends of Rock.

Musical style 
Stylistically the album borrows from the band's earlier, heavier roots, with elements of the later style still present. It features the return of the guitar harmonies and solos of the band, and can be described as a combination of their older and newer sound.

The song "Dead End" is the fourth In Flames song to feature female vocals (the others are "Everlost, Pt. 2" from Lunar Strain, "Whoracle" from Whoracle and "Metaphor" from Reroute to Remain).

Sales and awards 
The album debuted at number 1 in Sweden and number 58 on the American Billboard 200; it sold almost 25,000 copies in the US in its first week, and 50,000 in its first month. Since its release, the album has sold more than 110,000 copies in the United States and over 400,000 copies worldwide.

The album won the award for "Best Hard Rock Album" at the 2007 Swedish Grammis, over other nominated albums such as The Haunted's The Dead Eye and HammerFall's Threshold.

Come Clarity was named the best Swedish album of the past decade by readers of Swedish newspaper Aftonbladet.

Track listing

Release history 

Come Clarity was intended for release during summer or early fall 2005, but got delayed.

Alongside the standard version, a special plexiglass box, limited to 1,000 copies, was also released. It features the album split onto two discs and includes a certificate picture on a foil, as well as a DVD. The DVD features the band playing the album in its entirety, except for the final track of the album. However, the audio is not actually live, and is actually a studio recording played over the video. The DVD also features a photo gallery of the recording sessions of Come Clarity.

Personnel 
The drums, vocals, keys and programming were recorded at 'Dug Out Studio' in Uppsala, and guitars and bass were recorded at 'The Room' in Gothenburg. The album was mixed and mastered at 'Tonteknik Recording' in Umeå, Sweden.

In Flames
 Anders Fridén – vocals
 Björn Gelotte –  lead guitar
 Jesper Strömblad – rhythm guitar
 Peter Iwers – bass
 Daniel Svensson – drums

Additional musicians
 Örjan Örnkloo – keyboards and programming
 Uppsala Poker HC Crew – additional vocals on "Scream"
 Lisa Miskovsky – additional vocals on "Dead End"

Production
Eskil Lövstrom – mixing
Pelle Henricsson – mixing & mastering
Magnus Lander – tracking
Patric Ullaeus – photography
Derek Hess – artwork

Charts

Weekly charts

Year-end charts

References

External links 
 Come Clarity album details
 
 Peter Iwers speaks about Come Clarity

2006 albums
In Flames albums
Ferret Music albums
Nuclear Blast albums
Albums with cover art by Sons of Nero